Robert Charlton may refer to:

Robert M. Charlton (1807–1854), American politician and jurist
Sir Bobby Charlton (born 1937), England and Manchester United footballer
Robert Charleton (minister) (1809–1872), British Quaker minister